Coupling is a BBC Television sitcom. Written by Steven Moffat, it is based on his relationship with Sue Vertue, the show's producer. Martin Dennis directed all 28 episodes for Hartswood Films. The first episode was transmitted on 12 May 2000, and the final transmitted on 14 June 2004. The first three series were first broadcast on BBC Two, whereas the final series was broadcast on BBC Three.

The show centres on the dating and sexual adventures and mishaps of six friends in their thirties, often depicting the three women and the three men each talking amongst themselves about the same events, but in entirely different terms.

Series overview

Episodes

Series 1 (2000)

Series 2 (2001)

Series 3 (2002)

Series 4 (2004)

References

External links
 
 

BBC-related lists
Lists of British romance television series episodes
Lists of British sitcom episodes
Lists of sex comedy television series episodes